The AMD mobile platform is an open platform for laptops from AMD. Though little marketing was done on this platform, it has been competing with the Centrino platform in the segment to gain more marketshare. Each platform has its own specification, catching up the latest technology developments. Since the acquisition of ATI, AMD began to include Mobility Radeon GPUs and AMD chipsets as part of the requirements of the mobile platform; the first of such platforms is the Puma platform.

Open platform approach
In February 2007, AMD had announced the "Better by Design" initiative to continue the success of the open platform approach  for desktop back in early 2003 after the launch of Athlon 64 processors with a lack of chipset being developed by AMD, and open the platform to chipset vendors such as VIA, SiS, NVIDIA and from AMD subsidiary ATI. The initiative also includes platforms succeeding the Kite Refresh mobile platform.

Under the "Better by Design" initiative, AMD introduced a three-cell arrow sticker to identify mobile platform products, which the top cell being the processor (as Turion 64 X2). The middle cell for graphics accelerators as NVIDIA or ATI (as a result of retaining the use of "ATI Radeon" branding for graphics ), including onboard graphics (IGP), while the last cell representing the wireless (Wi-Fi, IEEE 802.11 standard) or LAN solutions, provided by one of the following companies: Airgo, Atheros, Broadcom, Marvell, Qualcomm, and Realtek.

The stickers to be used will be further classified by the system performance according to the processor performance, and into five classes, each having different colours as well as different logos for each component, listed as follows:

Market analysis
According to AMD figures in December 2007, AMD mobile platform gained 19% unit share in the market and about 23% revenue share of the firm during Q3 2007 while competing with the Intel Centrino platform. Figures for Q1 and Q2 2007 are 15% and 17% unit share, accounting for 14% and 16% of the company's revenue respectively.

AMD's mobile platform, even as recent as the Turion 64 X2 platform, has been criticized as consistently performing worse than Intel's Centrino in all areas: system speed, heat dissipation, and battery life.

Implementations

Initial platform (2003)
Launched in 2003, the initial platform for mobile AMD processors consists of:

Kite platform (2006)
Introduced in 2006, the Kite platform consists of:

Kite Refresh platform (2007)
AMD used Kite Refresh as the codenamed for the second-generation AMD mobile platform introduced in February 2007.

Puma platform (2008)
The Puma platform introduced in 2008 with June 2008 availability for the third-generation AMD mobile platform consists of:

Yukon platform (2009)
The ''Yukon platform was introduced on January 8, 2009, with expected April availability for the first AMD Ultrathin Platform targeting the ultra-portable notebook market.

Congo platform (2009)
The Congo platform  was introduced in September 2009, as the second AMD Ultrathin Platform targeting the ultra-portable notebook market.

Tigris platform (2009)
The Tigris platform  introduced in September 2009 for the AMD Mainstream Notebook Platform consists of:

Nile platform (2010)
The Nile platform  introduced on May 12, 2010, for the third AMD Ultrathin Platform consists of:

Danube platform (2010)
The Danube platform The 2010 AMD Mainstream Platform introduced on May 12, 2010, for the AMD Mainstream Notebook Platform consists of:

Brazos (Fusion) platform (2011)
The AMD low-power platform introduced on January 4, 2011, is designed for HD netbooks and other emerging form factors. It features the 40 nm C-Series (formerly codenamed Ontario, a 9-watt APU for netbooks and small form factor desktops and devices) and E-Series (formerly codenamed Zacate, an 18-watt TDP APU for ultrathin, mainstream, and value notebooks as well as desktops and all-in-ones) APUs.
Both low-power APU versions feature two Bobcat x86 cores and fully support DirectX11, DirectCompute (Microsoft programming interface for GPU computing) and OpenCL (cross-platform programming interface standard for multi-core x86 and accelerated GPU computing). Both also include UVD 3 dedicated hardware acceleration for HD video including 1080p resolutions. This platform consists of:

Sabine (Fusion) platform (2011)
The Sabine platform introduced on June 30, 2011, for the AMD Mainstream Notebook Platform consists of:

Comal (Fusion) platform (2012)
The Comal'' platform introduced on May 15, 2012, for the AMD Mainstream Notebook Platform consists of:

See also
 List of AMD mobile microprocessors
 List of AMD processors with 3D graphics
 List of AMD Turion microprocessors
 List of AMD Sempron microprocessors
 List of AMD Athlon 64 microprocessors
 List of AMD Phenom microprocessors

References

External links
 AMD Better by Design page
 TGDaily: AMD announces details of next-gen mobile processor "Griffin"
 The Inquirer: AMD Bulldozer to demolish Intel Santa Rosa
 AMD mobile platform rodamap from AMD Analyst day presentations, slide 29
AMD Better by Design event presentation

AMD platforms
Laptops